The Lockheed C-130 Hercules is a multipurpose military transport aircraft used by many different nations around the world. This is a list of the specific military units, as well as some civilian airlines, that fly it.

Africa

Algeria

Algerian Air Force
 32nd and U/I Transport Squadrons under Transport Wing operates 18 C-130 transports, including 8 C-130H, 8 C-130H-30, and 2 L-100-30 models.

Angola
Angolan Air Force 
 6th Transport Squadron received 6 C-130K, 3 L-100-20, and 2 L-100-30 aircraft, but none are in flying condition now.

Botswana
Botswana Air Force
Z10 Transport Squadron with 3 C-130B

Cameroon

Cameroon Air Force
 Transport Squadron operates 3 C-130H

Chad
Chad Air Force
 Operates 1 C-130H and lost 1 in 2006

Egypt

Egyptian Air Force
 26 Sqn based at Cairo West Airport (C-130H/C-130H-30/EC130H)

Ethiopia
Ethiopian Air Force
 Transport Squadron operates 4 C-130B/E and 2 L-100-30

Gabon
Gabon Air Force
 Heavy Transport Squadron operates 1 C-130H

Libya
Libyan Air Force
 16 C-130H ordered, with only 8 delivered and the remaining aircraft embargoed in 1971.

Free Libyan Air Force
 One C-130H captured in airworthy condition with 3 others at Gamal Abdul El Nasser Air Base.

Morocco

Royal Moroccan Air Force
 3rd Royal Moroccan Air Base/Escadre de Transport Aérien  based at Kenitra (C-130H)

Niger
Niger Air Force
 Operates 2 former United States Air Force C-130H, and a third aircraft will be delivered later.

Nigeria
Nigerian Air Force
 88 MAG based at Lagos (C-130H, C-130H-30). On 26 September 1992 a NAF Lockheed C-130H Hercules serial number 911 crashed three minutes after take-off from Lagos, Nigeria when three engines failed possibly due to high take-off weight. All 158 people on board were killed, including 8 foreign nationals.

South Africa

South African Air Force
The South African Air Force has 12 C-130s. 7 C-130BZs were bought in 1963. The US donated 3 C-130Fs (retired) and 2 C-130Bs in 1997/98.

 28 Squadron based at AFB Waterkloof, Pretoria operates 5 or 6 C-130BZ/B

Sudan
Sudanese Air Force
 Transport Squadron operates 1 C-130H; initially part of order of 6 C-130H from US in 1978-1979

Tunisia
Tunisian Air Force
 2 C-130B/H and 2 C-130J, with 2 additional surplus C-130H to be received from the United States.

Asia

Afghanistan
Afghan Air Force
 Operated 4 C-130H's 
Taliban
 captured an unknown number of Afghan Air Force C-130H's

Bangladesh
Bangladesh Air Force
 4 C-130B and 3 C-130J 2 more C-130J aircraft pending delivery.
 101 Squadron Special Flying Unit

Taiwan (Republic of China) 
Republic of China Air Force
 19 C-130Hs and 1 C130HE with 439th Combined Wing (439聯隊)
 10th Tactical Airlift Group (101st Airlift Squadron and 102nd Airlift Squadron) – C-130H
 20th Electronic Warfare Group (6th Electronic Warfare Squadron) – 1 C-130HE

India

Indian Air Force
 The Indian Air Force (IAF) inducted its first C-130J-30 Super Hercules on 5 February 2011. The remaining five on order were delivered by the end of 2011, and operated by 77 Squadron, the Veiled Vipers. On 3 October 2011 India announced its decision to buy six additional C-130J-30 Super Hercules with one more to replace the crashed aircraft taking the total to 12. The IAF has 12 C-130s in service since 2017.

Indonesia

TNI-AU – 23 C-130B/H, 1 KC-130B, and 1 C-130J (4 on order) as of March 2023.
 Skadron Udara 17 (VIP Squadron) – C-130H-30 (also operates Lockheed L-100-30)
 Skadron Udara 31 (Logistics & Transport Squadron) – C-130H-30 (also operates Lockheed L-100-30) and C130J-30
 Skadron Udara 32 (Logistics & Transport Squadron) – C-130H-30, C-130B/C and KC-130B

Iran

Islamic Republic of Iran Air Force
 28 C-130E/H in service as of December 2021.

Iraq
Iraqi Air Force
 23rd Squadron – 3 former USAF C-130Es received in 2005, and 6 new-build C-130J-30s ordered in 2009, delivered in 2012 and 2013.

Israel

Israeli Air Force
 103 "Elephants" Squadron at Nevatim (C-130E/H, KC-130H)
 131 "Yellow Bird" Squadron at Nevatim (C-130E/H, KC-130H)

Japan

Japan Air Self-Defense Force
 401st Tactical Airlift Squadron – JASDF Komaki Base
The Japan Defense Agency ordered the C-130H which was the newest model in 1981. The Japan Air Self-Defense Force (JASDF) purchased 16 in total to replace aging C-1 and YS-11P aircraft. The C-130Hs were received from 1984 to 1998.

JASDF C-130Hs were active in Iraq from 2004 to 2008. Two C-130Hs (95-1080 and 95-1083) have been equipped with aerial fuel-receiving and refueling functions, making them of KC-130H standard. This provides the JASDF with the ability to refuel the UH-60J search and rescue helicopters of its Air Rescue Wing.
Japan Maritime Self-Defense Force
 Air Transport Squadron 61 – JMSDF Atsugi Base
The JMSDF bought six used KC-130R aircraft that were in storage, having been previously operated by the US Marines. There was some speculation that they may be used as gunships with the Harvest HAWK kit. In actuality they were purchased to replace three aging YS-11M/M-A aircraft of Air Transport Squadron 61.

Their air to air refueling equipment was removed, making them of C-130R standard. Corrosion repair was done and the aircraft were refitted with new landing gear supports, cargo door supports and center wing rainbow fittings. In addition to structural modifications, Japan received thirty overhauled T56-A-16 engines and digital cockpit upgrades to include a digital GPS. Regeneration of the first aircraft began in November 2012 and was planned to be completed by Fall 2013. The six C-130Rs were supplied from 2014 to 2016.

Jordan

Royal Jordanian Air Force
 3 Sqn based at Al Matar Airbase/Amman (currently operates 7 C-130H/E & 2 Casa CN-295), older C-130Bs were sold to Republic of Singapore Air Force (RSAF) and converted to KC-130B configuration in early 1980s.

Kuwait
Kuwait Air Force
 41 Sqn based at Kuwait International Airport (L-100-30)

Malaysia
Royal Malaysian Air Force
 14 Sqn based at Labuan (C-130H)
 20 Sqn based at Subang (C-130H, C-130H-30, C-130T)

North Yemen
Yemen Arab Republic Air Force
 2 C-130H bought in 1979 with Saudi financing, and operated by the 115th Transport Squadron based at Daylami AB. Both aircraft were inherited by the Yemeni Air Force after the unification.

Oman

Royal Air Force of Oman
 16 Sqn based at Seeb (3 C-130H / 1 C-130J / 1 C-130J-30)

Pakistan
Pakistan Air Force
 Composite Air Transport Wing, PAF Base Nur Khan
 No.6 Squadron Antelopes (C-130B, C-130E, L-100)

Philippines

Philippine Air Force
 222nd Airlift Sq, 220th Airlift Wing - 5 C-130B/H/T based in Mactan-Benito Ebuen Airbase, 2 C-130H/T are currently operational, 2 C-130B/T are undergoing repairs, and 1 C-130H burned down and was cannibalized for parts. 2 refurbished C-130H were purchased in 2019 and are awaiting delivery while the acquisition of 5 C-130J was recently approved and is awaiting funding.

Qatar
Qatar Emiri Air Force
 Transport Squadron received four C-130Js on order for delivery from 2011

Saudi Arabia

Royal Saudi Air Force
 1 Sqn based at Prince Sultan Airbase (VC-130H, L-100-30)
 4 Sqn based at Jeddah (C-130E, C-130H, C-130H-30)
 16 Sqn based at Prince Sultan Airbase (C-130E, C-130H, L-100-30)
 32 Sqn based at Prince Sultan Airbase (KC-130H)

Armed Forces Medical Services
 Operates 1 VC-130H flying hospital

Singapore

Republic of Singapore Air Force
122 Squadron – 5× C-130H, 1× KC-130H, 2× C-130B (ex-USAF) and 2× KC-130B (ex-Royal Jordanian Air Force airframes) based at Paya Lebar Air Base. Starting from 2010, all 10 aircraft will progressively undergo an extensive modernisation/upgrade process by ST Aerospace to bring them up to a common standard (K/C-130H3) with the replacement of cockpit flight management system by a modern glass cockpit avionics suite, central engine displays to replace analogue gauges, improved voice communications, digital autopilot, flight director as well as a digital weather radar, which will make the aircraft Global Air Traffic Management (GATM)-compliant. Also, the C-130Bs will receive an auxiliary power unit and environmental control system in common with the C-130Hs.

Korea
Republic of Korea Air Force
 Introduced into service in January 1988.
 Operates 12 C-130H and 4 C-130J as of December 2021.

Sri Lanka
Sri Lanka Air Force
 No. 2 Heavy Transport Squadron based at SLAF Ratmalana (C-130K)

Thailand
Royal Thai Air Force
 601 Squadron-6th Wing-Don Muang RTAFB Bangkok (12 aircraft)

United Arab Emirates
United Arab Emirates Air Force
 Operates 8: C-130H-30/L-100 under Transport Wing and C-130H under Central Air Command

Yemen
Yemen Air Force
 The 1st Squadron of the 2nd Aviation Brigade operated 2 C-130H as of 2013-2014. Only one was operational, with the other in a state of disrepair.

Europe

Austria
Austrian Air Force
 Kommando Luftunterstützung, Lufttransportstaffel und Fliegertechnische Kompanie 130 Linz/Horsching (C-130K)

Denmark
Royal Danish Air Force
 721 Eskadrille – Aalborg (4 C-130J-30)

France

French Air and Space Force
 Escadron de Transport 2/61 Franche-Comté based at Orléans – Bricy Air Base (C-130H / C-130H-30 / 2 C-130J-30 / 2 KC-130J)
 Escadron de Transport 3/61 Poitou based at Orléans – Bricy Air Base

Germany
German Air Force 
the German Air Force will operate 3 C-130J-30 and 3 KC-130J by 2022

Greece

Hellenic Air Force
 112 Pterix 356 Mira 'Iraklis' – Elefsis (10 C-130H and 5 ex US C-130B, all with upgraded avionics by Spar Aerospace)

Italy
The Italian Air Force operated 14 Lockheed C-130H Hercules from 1972 until 2001
Currently operates:
 46 Brigata Aerea, 2 Gruppo – Pisa-San Giusto 12x C-130J (6x with KC-130J kit)
 46 Brigata Aerea, 50 Gruppo – Pisa-San Giusto 10x C-130J-30

Netherlands

Royal Netherlands Air Force
 336 Squadron – Eindhoven (2x C-130H, 2x C-130H-30)

Norway
Royal Norwegian Air Force
 335 Squadron, Gardermoen Air Station, Ullensaker (4 x C-130J operational since 2008 replacing 6 x C-130H 1969–2008)

Poland
Polish Air Force
 14 Eskadra Lotnictwa Transportowego, Powidz (5 ex-USAF C-130E Hercules overhauled and delivered to Poland in 2009–2012 as part of military aid, 3 more C-130E leased between 2009 and 2012 as interim solution, two of them are retired and given to Poland for spares, last one returned to USA). In 2021 Poland ordered a batch of 5 surplus USAF C-130H under Excess Defense Articles program with deliveries expected until 2024.

Portugal
Portuguese Air Force
 Esquadra 501 – Montijo Air Base (BA6) (C-130H/H-30)

Romania
Romanian Air Force
 90th Airlift Base – Otopeni-Bucharest (4 C-130B from 1996, 1 C-130H from 2007,1 C-130H from 2021)

Sweden
Swedish Air Force
Sweden has operated eight C-130 aircraft (locally designated the Tp 84), originally delivered as C-130Es beginning in February 1965.  They were upgraded to C-130H standard in the 1980s and are assigned to Skaraborg Wing (F 7), 3 Transportflygenhet based at Såtenäs.  The first aircraft delivered as withdrawn from service on 9 June 2014, with the second scheduled to follow shortly.

Turkey

Turkish Air Force
 222 Filo based at Erkilet (C-130B, C-130E)
 7 C-130E Hercules (to be upgraded)
 5 C-130B Hercules (With ELINT/SIGINT equipment)
All C-130 aircraft in Turkish service were to begin a 56-month upgrade by Turkish Aerospace Industries termed the Erciyes Program. Two are to be done directly at TAI while the remainder will be upgraded by the Air Force under TAI oversight. Primary aim of the upgrade is to improve the avionics with 17 new systems and five upgraded ones. Turkish content in both hardware and software has been increased to reduce long term costs.

United Kingdom

Royal Air Force
 No. 24 Squadron – RAF Brize Norton (C.4/C.5)
 No. 47 Squadron – RAF Brize Norton (C.4/C.5)
 No. 206 Squadron – RAF Brize Norton (C.4/C.5)
 Formerly - No. 70 Squadron – RAF Lyneham (C.1/C.3) - converted to the Airbus A400M.
 No. 1312 Flight – Mount Pleasant, Falkland Islands (C.1)
Met Office
 Meteorological Research Flight – RAE Farnborough (W.2)

North America

Canada
Canadian Armed Forces Air Command/Royal Canadian Air Force
8 Wing Trenton
 No. 424 Squadron RCAF – Trenton, Ontario (CC-130E/H T56-15)
 No. 426 Squadron RCAF – Trenton, Ontario (CC-130E/H T56-15)
 No. 436 Squadron RCAF – Trenton, Ontario (CC-130E/H T56-15), will operate all 17 Canadian Forces CC-130J transports due to arrive by April 2012
 14 Wing Greenwood
 No. 413 Squadron RCAF- Greenwood, Nova Scotia (CC-130E T56-15 X3)
 17 Wing Winnipeg
 No. 435 Squadron RCAF – Winnipeg, Manitoba (CC-130E + 5 CC-130HR(T))

Honduras
Honduras Air Force
 5 ex-USAF C-130A assigned to Transport Squadron - 1 converted to C-130D with status of 2 unknown and 3 C-130A stored

Mexico

Mexican Air Force
 302 Air Squadron, Santa Lucía airbase, Estado de México (3 C-130K/L-100)

United States
United States Air Force
 1st Special Operations Squadron – Kadena Air Base, Japan (MC-130H)
 2d Airlift Squadron – Pope Air Force Base, Fayetteville, North Carolina (C-130H)
 4th Special Operations Squadron – Hurlburt Field, Florida (AC-130J/U)
 7th Special Operations Squadron – RAF Mildenhall, United Kingdom (MC-130H)
 9th Special Operations Squadron – Eglin Air Force Base, Florida (MC-130P)
 14th Weapons Squadron –  Hurlburt Field, Florida (MC-130H)
 15th Special Operations Squadron – Hurlburt Field, Florida (MC-130H)
 15th Test Squadron – Hill Air Force Base, Utah (C-130H)
 16th Special Operations Squadron – Cannon AFB, New Mexico (AC-130W Stinger II)
 17th Special Operations Squadron – Kadena Air Base, Japan (MC-130P)
 19th Special Operations Squadron – Hurlburt Field, Florida (AC-130U/H)
 35th Expeditionary Airlift Squadron – Muñiz Air National Guard Base / Munoz Marin IAP, Puerto Rico (C-130E/H)
 36th Airlift Squadron – Yokota Air Base, Japan (C-130J)
 37th Airlift Squadron – Ramstein Air Base, Germany (C-130J-30)
 38th Expeditionary Airlift Squadron – Ramstein Air Base, Germany (C-130J-30)
 39th Airlift Squadron – Dyess Air Force Base, Texas (C-130J)
 39th Rescue Squadron (Air Force Reserve Command) – Patrick Space Force Base, Cocoa Beach, Florida (HC-130J)
 40th Airlift Squadron – Dyess Air Force Base, Texas (C-130J)
 40th Flight Test Squadron – Eglin Air Force Base, Florida (MC-130E)
 41st Airlift Squadron – Little Rock Air Force Base, Arkansas(C-130J)
 41st Electronic Combat Squadron – Davis–Monthan Air Force Base, Tucson, Arizona (EC-130H)
 42d Electronic Combat Squadron – Davis–Monthan Air Force Base, Tucson, Arizona (EC-130H)
 43d Electronic Combat Squadron – Davis–Monthan Air Force Base, Tucson, Arizona (EC-130H)
 48th Airlift Squadron – Little Rock Air Force Base, Arkansas (C-130J)
 50th Airlift Squadron – Now at MacDill Air Force Base, Florida (KC-135R)
 53d Airlift Squadron – Little Rock Air Force Base, Arkansas (C-130J)
 53d Weather Reconnaissance Squadron (Air Force Reserve Command) – Keesler Air Force Base, Biloxi, Mississippi (WC-130J)
 61st Airlift Squadron – Little Rock Air Force Base, Arkansas (C-130J)
 62nd Airlift Squadron – Little Rock Air Force Base, Arkansas (C-130J)
 67th Special Operation Squadron – Mildenhall, United Kingdom (MC-130J Commando II)
 71st Rescue Squadron – Moody Air Force Base, Georgia (HC-130J Combat King II)
 79th Rescue Squadron – Davis Monthan Air Force Base, Tucson, Arizona (HC-130J Combat King II)
 96th Airlift Squadron (Air Force Reserve Command) – Minneapolis, Minnesota (C-130H3)
 328th Airlift Squadron (Air Force Reserve Command) – Niagara Falls Air Reserve Station, New York (KC-135R)
 339th Flight Test Squadron – Robins Air Force Base, Georgia
 357th Airlift Squadron (Air Force Reserve Command) – Maxwell Air Force Base, Montgomery, Alabama (C-130H)
 413th Flight Test Squadron – Hurlburt Field, Florida
 418th Flight Test Squadron – Edwards Air Force Base, California (NC-130H, C-130J)
 550th Special Operations Squadron – Kirtland Air Force Base, Albuquerque, New Mexico (MC-130P, MC-130H)
 645th Material Squadron Detachment 1 – LA/Palmdale Regional Airport / Air Force Plant 42, California (MC-130E, EC-130H)
 700th Airlift Squadron (Air Force Reserve Command) – Dobbins Air Reserve Base, Atlanta, Georgia (C-130H)
 731st Airlift Squadron (Air Force Reserve Command) – Peterson Air Force Base, Colorado Springs, Colorado (C-130H)
 757th Airlift Squadron (Air Force Reserve Command) – Youngstown-Warren Air Reserve Station / Youngstown Regional Airport, Youngstown, Ohio (C-130H)
 774th Expeditionary Airlift Squadron – Bagram Air Base, Afghanistan (C-130E/H)
 777th Expeditionary Airlift Squadron – Ali Air Base, Iraq (C-130H)
 815th Airlift Squadron (Air Force Reserve Command) – Keesler Air Force Base, Mississippi (C-130J)

United States Air National Guard
 102d Rescue Squadron – New York Air National Guard – Francis S. Gabreski Air National Guard Base / Francis S. Gabreski Airport, Westhampton Beach, New York (HC-130J)
 109th Airlift Squadron – Minnesota Air National Guard – Minneapolis-Saint Paul Joint Air Reserve Station, Minneapolis–Saint Paul International Airport, Minnesota (C-130H)
 115th Airlift Squadron – California Air National Guard – Channel Islands Air National Guard Station, Port Hueneme, California (C-130J-30)
 118th Airlift Squadron - Connecticut Air National Guard - Bradley Air National Guard Base, Windsor Locks, Connecticut (C-130H)
 130th Rescue Squadron – California Air National Guard – Moffett Field, Sunnyvale, California (HC-130J Combat King II)
 130th Airlift Squadron – West Virginia Air National Guard – Charleston Air National Guard Base / Yeager Airport, Charleston, West Virginia (C-130J)
 139th Airlift Squadron – New York Air National Guard – Schenectady County Airport, Scotia, New York (LC/C-130H)
 142d Airlift Squadron – Delaware Air National Guard – Wilmington, Delaware (C-130H)
 143d Airlift Squadron – Rhode Island Air National Guard – Quonset State Airport, (C-130J)
 154th Training Squadron – Arkansas Air National Guard – Little Rock Air Force Base, Arkansas (C-130H)
 158th Airlift Squadron – Georgia Air National Guard – Savannah, Georgia (C-130H)
 164th Airlift Squadron – Ohio Air National Guard – Mansfield, Ohio (C-130H)
 165th Airlift Squadron – Kentucky Air National Guard – Louisville International Airport, Louisville, Kentucky (C-130J)
 169th Airlift Squadron – Illinois Air National Guard – General Wayne A. Downing Peoria International Airport, Peoria County, Illinois (C-130H)
 180th Airlift Squadron – Missouri Air National Guard – Rosecrans Memorial Airport, Saint Joseph, Missouri (C-130H)
 181st Airlift Squadron – Texas Air National Guard – NAS JRB Fort Worth (Carswell Air Reserve Station), Fort Worth, Texas (C-130J)
 186th Airlift Squadron - Montana Air National Guard - Great Falls, Montana (C-130H)
 187th Airlift Squadron – Wyoming Air National Guard – Cheyenne, Wyoming (C-130H)
 192d Airlift Squadron – Nevada Air National Guard – Reno/Tahoe International Airport, Nevada (C-130H)
 193d Special Operations Squadron – Pennsylvania Air National Guard – Olmsted Field (EC-130J)
 211th Rescue Squadron – Alaska Air National Guard – Joint Base Elmendorf–Richardson, Anchorage, Alaska (HC-130J)

United States Coast Guard
 5th Coast Guard District, Coast Guard Air Station Elizabeth City, North Carolina (HC-130J)
 7th Coast Guard District, Coast Guard Air Station Clearwater, St. Petersburg-Clearwater International Airport, Florida (HC-130H)
 11th Coast Guard District, Coast Guard Air Station Sacramento, McClellan, California (HC-130H)
 14th Coast Guard District, Coast Guard Air Station Barbers Point, Kalaeloa Airport, Oahu, Hawaii (HC-130H)
 17th Coast Guard District Kodiak Island, Alaska (HC-130H)
 Coast Guard Aviation Training Center, Mobile Regional Airport, Mobile, Alabama (HC-130H training)
United States Marine Corps
 VMGR-152 Marine Aerial Refueler Transport Squadron – "Sumos" MCAS Futenma, Okinawa, Japan (KC-130J)
 VMGR-234 Marine Aerial Refueler Transport Squadron "Rangers" NAS JRB Fort Worth, Texas (KC-130J)
 VMGR-252 Marine Aerial Refueler Transport Squadron "Otis" MCAS Cherry Point, North Carolina (KC-130J)
 VMGR-352 Marine Aerial Refueler Transport Squadron "Raiders" MCAS Miramar, San Diego, California (KC-130J)
 VMGR-452 Marine Aerial Refueler Transport Squadron "Yankees" Stewart Air National Guard Base, New York (KC-130J)
 VMGRT-253 Marine Aerial Refueler Transport Training Squadron "Titans" MCAS Cherry Point, North Carolina (KC-130F/R/T)(Decommissioned)

United States Navy
 United States Navy Flight Demonstration Squadron "Blue Angels" – Naval Air Station Pensacola, Florida (C-130T) Blue Angels : Official Website
 VX-20 Development Squadron – Patuxent River, Washington, D.C. (KC-130F/J)
 Air Test and Evaluation Squadron THREE ZERO "Bloodhounds" – Point Mugu, California (DC-130A/KC-130F)
 VR-53 Fleet Logistics Support Squadron (Reserve) "Capital Express" – Washington, DC
 VR-54 Fleet Logistics Support Squadron (Reserve) "Revelers" – Naval Air Station Joint Reserve Base New Orleans, Louisiana
 VR-55 Fleet Logistics Support Squadron (Reserve) "Minutemen" – Naval Air Station Point Mugu, California
 VR-62 Fleet Logistics Support Squadron (Reserve) "Nomads" – Naval Air Station Jacksonville, Florida
 VR-64 Fleet Logistics Support Squadron (Reserve) "Condors" – Joint Base McGuire-Dix-Lakehurst, New Jersey

South America

Argentina
Argentine Air Force
 1st Air Brigade
 1st Air Transport Squadron – El Palomar Air Base (3x/5x C-130B/H, 2x KC-130H, L-100-30)

Bolivia
Bolivian Air Force
 Escuadrón de Transporte 710 with 2x C-130B and 1x C-130H
 Fuerza de Tarea Diablos Negros with 3x C-130B
 Transporte Aéreos Bolivianos with 1x RC-130A

Brazil
Brazilian Air Force
 1. Grupo de Transporte – Galeão (C-130E) 11x aircraft in service
 1.Grupo de Transporte de Tropas – Galeão 10x C-130H and 2x KC-130 in service
  Called C-130M (Modernized by Derco) In Brazilian Service (Total: 5x C-130E/ 3x RC-130E/ 13x C-130H/ 2x KC-130)
In 2001 FAB obtained ten ex-Italian Air Force, (AMI) C-130H models, which were replaced in Italian AMI service by new C-130J's.

Chile
Chilean Air Force
 Grupo de Aviación N°10 (4xKC-130R, 2x C-130H, 1x C-130B)

Colombia
Colombian Air Force
 Air Command for Military Transportation (CATAM) – Bogotá
 Grupo de Transporte Aéreo 81 (C-130B, C-130H, C-130H-1)

Ecuador
Ecuadorian Air Force
 11 Transport Wing (Ala de transporte 11) - Latacunga Air Base
 1111 Transport Squadron "Hercules" (Esc. de transporte 1111 "Hercules") - operating C-130B/H

Peru
Peruvian Air Force
 operates 3 L-100s as of December 2021.

Uruguay

Uruguayan Air Force
 received 2 KC-130H from the Spanish Air Force in December 2020.

Venezuela
Venezuelan Air Force
 Operates 3 C-130H as of December 2021.

Oceania

Australia

Royal Australian Air Force
 No. 36 Squadron RAAF – (1958-2006)(C-130A)(C-130H)
 No. 37 Squadron RAAF – RAAF Base Richmond, New South Wales (1966-)(C-130E)(C-130J)
 RAAF C-130 was used in 1982 for testing Modular Airborne Fire Fighting System

Country Fire Authority
 Fire Bomber

New Zealand
Royal New Zealand Air Force
 No. 40 Squadron – Whenuapai, Auckland (5x C-130H)

Civilian operators

Germany
Wirtschaftsflug
 One aircraft operated – leased, based at Frankfurt Rhein-Main 1983

Ireland
Air Contractors
 One aircraft operated (L-100) – leased from Safair

South Africa
Safair
 Operates 3 L100-30

Switzerland
Zimex Aviation
 2 L100-30 operated for Red Cross

United States
Lynden Air Cargo
 9 L-382 Hercules for cargo operations; largest civilian operator in the world.

United States
International Air Response
 5 Lockheed C-130A Hercules for specialized aerial operations; largest civilian specialized aerial services operator in the world.
Prescott Support
3 L-100's;
Chery Aviation
 1 ex-Royal Australian Air Force C-130A A97-212 (now N131EC)
 unknown
 1 C-130A water bomber; ex-USAF and ex-Republic of Vietnam Air Force
 Neptune Aviation Services
 AT-130 water tanker

Former users

Belgium
Belgian Air Component
 15th wing – Brussels-Melsbroek (11 x C-130H)

Canada

Pacific Western Airlines
 2 L-100 for cargo operations

First Air
 2 L-382 Hercules for cargo operations in the Arctic

Peru
Peruvian Air Force
 842 Squadron once operated C-130

Spain

Spanish Air Force
 Esc 311 Zaragoza (C-130H/H-30)
 Esc 312 Zaragoza (KC/C-130H)

United States
Delta Air Lines
 Freight division, during the 1970s

South Vietnam
Republic of Vietnam Air Force
 Former operator. No longer in service. 32 C-130A's were supplied in 1972 as part of Operation Enhance Plus, forming two transport squadrons (435th and 437th) based at Tan Son Nhut Air Base .

See also
 Lockheed AC-130
 Lockheed EC-130
 Lockheed HC-130
 Lockheed MC-130
 Lockheed WC-130

References

Lists of military units and formations by aircraft
Operators
C-130